The José Cabrera Nuclear Power Station (also known as Zorita) was a nuclear power station in Almonacid de Zorita,  east of Madrid, Spain.

The power plant consisted of a single PWR of 160 MWe, built by Westinghouse Electric Company. It was operated by Unión Fenosa.

History
Construction of the power station started in 1964. It was commissioned in 1968, and it operated from 1968 until 2006. In 2006, it was closed by ministerial order.

On 11 February 2010, Unión Fenosa transferred the site's ownership to Enresa, a Spanish company responsible for decommissioning the power station. Enresa planned to clear the site by the end of 2015.

2003 incident

The Spanish Nuclear Safety Council has investigated the plant's deficient safety system and a missing screw that prevented the reactor from resuming operations after a month-long refueling operation in December 2003.

See also

List of nuclear reactors
Nuclear power in Spain
Template:Spain nuke plant map

References

External links

 Plant information summary (in Spanish).
 Plant description (in Spanish) and site photo.
 IMDB entry for the 1969 film.

Nuclear power stations in Spain
Buildings and structures in the Province of Guadalajara
Nuclear power stations using pressurized water reactors
Energy in Castilla–La Mancha